Johnny Mitsias is a Greece international rugby league footballer who plays as a er for the Western Suburbs Magpies in the NSW Cup.

Background
Mitsias was born in Australia and is of Greek heritage.

Playing career
In 2022, Mitsias was named in the Greece squad for the 2021 Rugby League World Cup, the first ever Greek Rugby League squad to compete in a World Cup.

References

External links
Western Suburbs Magpies profile
Greek profile

1999 births
Living people
Australian rugby league players
Australian people of Greek descent
Greece national rugby league team players
Rugby league wingers